Lithosia gynaegrapha is a moth of the subfamily Arctiinae. It was described by Joseph de Joannis in 1930. It is found in Vietnam.

References

 Natural History Museum Lepidoptera generic names catalog

Lithosiina
Moths described in 1930